Alice Eleanor Jones (1916 – 1981) was an American science fiction writer and journalist.

Biography
Jones was born on 30 March 1916 in Philadelphia, to Henry Stayton Jones and Lucy A. Jones (née Schuler). Her father was a photoengraver for a publishing firm. She had one sister. Jones got her bachelor's degree from the University of Pennsylvania in 1936 and her Ph.D. in English literature from the same university in 1944. She married another graduate student and speculative fiction author Homer Nearing Jr. and they moved to Swarthmore, Pennsylvania. The couple had two sons, Geoffrey and Gregory.

Jones had a long career in publishing for a number of magazines including Redbook, Ladies’ Home Journal, The Saturday Evening Post, Woman’s Day, American Girl, and Seventeen. She published articles which were both fiction and nonfiction. She wrote for these journals until the 1960s. During 1955 she published briefly in genre magazines and her work has since been reissued by Strange Horizons. Her work is recognized for its strong feminist tones. For example, in "Created he Them," Jones focus on women's perspective "merges contemporary understandings of nuclear war with the maternalist sensibilities of women's peace activism" according to Lisa Yaszsek.

Selected works

Chapbooks
 The Happy Clown, (2019)

Short fiction
 Life, Incorporated, (1955) published in Fantastic Universe Science Fiction magazine~April 1955
 Created He Them, (1955) published in The Magazine of Fantasy and Science Fiction, June 1955
 Miss Quatro, (1955) published in Fantastic Universe, June 1955
 Recruiting Officer, (1955) published in Fantastic, October 1955
 The Happy Clown, (1955) published in  If, December 1955

References and sources

1916 births
1981 deaths
American science fiction writers
University of Pennsylvania alumni
Writers from Philadelphia
American women journalists
American journalists